Henriette Theodora Markovitch (22 November 1907 – 16 July 1997), known as Dora Maar, was a French photographer, painter, and poet. A romantic partner of Pablo Picasso, Maar was depicted in a number of Picasso's paintings, including his Portrait of Dora Maar and Dora Maar au Chat.

Biography 
Henriette Theodora Markovitch was the only daughter of Josip Marković (aka Joseph Markovitch) (1874–1969), a Croatian architect who studied in Zagreb, Vienna, and then Paris where he settled in 1896, and of his spouse, Catholic-raised Louise-Julie Voisin (1877–1942), originally from Cognac.

In 1910, the family left for Buenos Aires where the father obtained several commissions including for the embassy of Austria-Hungary. His achievements earned him the honor of being decorated by Emperor Francis Joseph I, even though he was "the only architect who did not make a fortune in Buenos Aires".

In 1926, the family returned to Paris. Dora Maar, a pseudonym she chose, took courses at the Central Union of Decorative Arts and the School of Photography. She also enrolled at the École des Beaux-Arts and the Académie Julian which had the advantage of offering the same instruction to women as to men. Maar frequented André Lhote's workshop where she met Henri Cartier-Bresson.

While studying at the École des Beaux-Arts, Maar met fellow female surrealist Jacqueline Lamba. About her, Maar said, "I was closely linked with Jacqueline. She asked me, "where are those famous surrealists?" and I told her about Cafe de la Place Blanche." Lamba then began to frequent the cafe where she would eventually meet André Breton, whom she would later marry.

When the workshop ceased its activities, Maar left Paris, alone, for Barcelona and then London, where she photographed the effects of the economic depression following the Wall Street Crash of 1929 in the United States. On her return, and with the help of her father, she opened another workshop at 29 Rue d'Astorg in the 8th arrondissement of Paris.

In 1935, Maar was introduced to Pablo Picasso and became his companion and muse. She took pictures in his studio at the Grands Augustins and tracked the latter stages of his epic work, Guernica. She later acted as a model for his piece titled Monument à Apollinaire, a tribute to the late poet Guillaume Apollinaire.

Dora Maar the photographer 
Maar's earliest surviving photographs were taken in the early 1920s  while on a cargo ship going to the Cape Verde Islands.

At the beginning of 1930, she set up a photography studio on rue Campagne-Première (14th arrondissement of Paris) with Pierre Kéfer, photographer, and decorator for Jean Epstein's 1928 film, The Fall of the House of Usher. In the studio, Maar and Kefer worked together mostly on commercial photography for advertisements and fashion magazines. Her father assisted with her finances in this period of her life as she was establishing herself while trying to earn a living. The studio displayed fashion, advertising and nudes, and it became very successful.

She met the photographer Brassaï with whom she shared the darkroom in the studio. Brassai once said that she had "bright eyes and an attentive gaze, a disturbing stare at times".

During this time working in advertising and fashion photography, the influence of Surrealism could be seen in her work through her heavy use of mirrors and contrasting shadows . She felt that art should represent the content of reality through links with intuitions or ideas, rather than visually reproduce the natural. Maar also met Louis-Victor Emmanuel Sougez, a photographer working for advertising, archeology and artistic director of the newspaper L'Illustration, whom she considered a mentor.

In 1932, she had an affair with the filmmaker Louis Chavance.

Maar frequented the "October group", formed around Jacques Prévert and Max Morise after their break from surrealism.

She had her first publication in the magazine Art et Métiers Graphiques in 1932.

Her first solo exhibition was held at the Galerie Vanderberg in Paris.

It is the gelatin silver works of the surrealist period that remain the most sought after by admirers: Portrait of Ubu (1936), 29 rue d'Astorg, black and white, collages, photomontages or superimpositions. The photograph represents the central character in a popular series of plays by Alfred Jarry called Ubu Roi. The work was first shown at the Exposition Surréaliste d'objets at the Galerie Charles Ratton in Paris and at the International Surrealist Exhibition in London in 1936. She also participated in Participates in Fantastic Art, Dada, Surrealism, at the MoMA in New York the same year.

Surrealist concepts and interests often aligned with the ideas of the political left of the time and so Maar became very politically active at this point in her life. After the fascist demonstrations of 6 February 1934, in Paris along with René Lefeuvre, Jacques Soustelle, supported by Simone Weil and Georges Bataille, she signed the tract "Appeal to the Struggle" written at the initiative of André Breton. Much of her work is highly influenced by leftist politics of the time, often depicting those who had been thrown into poverty by the Depression. She was part of an ultra-leftist association called "Masses", where she first met Georges Bataille, an anti-fascist organization called the Union of Intellectuals Against Fascism, and a radical collective of left-wing actors and writers called October.

She also was involved in many Surrealist groups and often participated in demonstrations, convocations, and cafe conversations. She signed many manifestos, including one titled "When Surrealists were Right" in August 1935 which concerned the Congress of Paris, which had been held in March of that year.

In 1935, she took a photo of fashion illustrator and designer Christian Berard that was described by writer and critic Michael Kimmelman as "wry and mischievous with only his head perceived above the fountain as if he were John the Baptist on a silver platter".

In the 1980s, she made a number of photograms.

Relationship with Pablo Picasso
Maar first saw Pablo Picasso at the end of 1935 when she was taking promotional shots on the set of the Jean Renoir film The Crime of Monsieur Lange. She was captivated by him, but they did not formally meet. Maar was introduced to Picasso a few days later by their mutual friend Paul Eluard at Cafe des Deux Magots. The story of their first encounter was told by the writer Jean-Paul Crespelle, "the young woman serious face, lit up by pale blue eyes which looked all the paler because of her thick eyebrows; a sensitive uneasy face, with light and shade passing alternately over it. She kept driving a small pointed pen-knife between her fingers into the wood of the table. Sometimes she missed and a drop of blood appeared between the roses embroidered on her black gloves... Picasso would ask Dora to give him the gloves and would lock them up in the showcase he kept for his mementos."

Picasso was intrigued by Maar's seductive and masochistic behaviour, which served as inspiration for many of his works throughout their relationship. Their liaison would last nearly nine years, during which time Picasso did not end his relationship with Marie-Thérèse Walter, mother of his daughter Maya.

Maar photographed the successive stages of the creation of Guernica, painted by Picasso in his studio in the rue des Grands-Augustins from May to June 1937; Picasso used these photographs in his creative process. She was Picasso's principal model, and he often represented her in tears. Maar boosted Picasso's understanding of politics and taught him skills in photography. Maar also introduced Picasso to the method of combining photography and printmaking, also known as the cliché verre technique.

Dora Maar as "The Weeping Woman"

Maar is very well known for her role as Picasso's lover, subject, and muse. As such, he painted many portraits of her. In the majority of these paintings, Maar was represented as a tortured, anguished woman. The most well known of these portraits is The Weeping Woman. Picasso was very inspired by the tragedies of the Spanish Civil War, and he thought of Maar as a living depiction of the pain and suffering that people experienced during this time. Maar did not appreciate Picasso's depiction of her in this way. When asked about his portraits of her, she said "all portraits of me are lies. They're Picassos. Not one is Dora Maar".

Her liaison with Picasso, who physically abused her and made her fight Marie-Therese Walter for his love, ended in 1943, although they met again episodically until 1946. Thus, on 19 March 1944, she played the role of Fat Anguish in the reading, at the home of Michel Leiris, of Picasso' first play, Desire Caught by the Tail, led by Albert Camus. In 1944, through the intermediary of Paul Éluard, Maar met Jacques Lacan, who took care of her nervous breakdown through years of analysis, in which her mental health began to improve. Picasso bought her a house in Ménerbes, Vaucluse, where she retired and lived alone. She turned to the Catholic religion, met the painter Nicolas de Staël (who lived in the same village), and turned to abstract painting.

Dora Maar the painter 
The painted works of Maar remained unrecognized until their posthumous sale, organized in 1999, which made the public and professionals discover a very personal production that had never left her studio.

Maar abandoned photography for painting alongside leaving Picasso and his influence, or rather the crushing presence of the painter, who had imposed on her a cubistic style. Pushed by Picasso to express herself in this style, one can wonder about Picasso's desire to remove his lover from the domain where she excelled, and to constrain her in a style of painting which he had long mastered.

It was from the painful separation of Picasso that Maar truly became a painter. Tragic figurative works, such as the Portrait of Eluard, or Self-Portrait to The Child of 1946, translate, in dark tones, the pain of post-war years.

After years of struggling with depression, Maar confined herself within her own memories. It is between the 1960s and 70s that there was the beginning of a respite when she experimented with abstract formats in shimmering colors. It was in the 1980s, though that the painter expressed herself fully in her many paintings of the Luberon region. Paintings of the landscapes around her house in Ménerbes, showed locations dominated by wind and clouds, strongly revealing the struggle of an artist with the ghosts of her past.

Death

Maar spent her last years in her apartment in Rue de Savoie, in the Left Bank of Paris. She died on 16 July 1997, at 89 years old. She was buried in the Bois-Tardieu cemetery in Clamart. Her experiments with photograms and dark-room photography were only found posthumously.

Legacy 
Although Maar is mostly remembered as one of Picasso's lovers, there have been many recent exhibits presenting her as an artist in her own right, including exhibitions at the Haus der Kunst, Munich, 13 October 2001 – 6 January 2002; the Centre de la Vieille Charité, Marseille, 20 January – 4 May 2002; the Centre Cultural Tecla Sala, Barcelona, 15 May – 15 July 2002; the Centre Pompidou, Paris, 5 June 2019 – 29 July 2019; and the Tate Modern, London, 20 November 2019 – 15 March 2020.

Maar was played by Samantha Colley in the 2018 season of Genius, which focuses on the life and art of Picasso.

References

Further reading 
 Louise Baring: Dora Maar: Paris in the Time of Man Ray, Jean Cocteau, and Picasso, Rizzoli, 2017
Brigitte Benkemoun, Finding Dora Maar: An Artist, an Address Book, a Life.. Trans. Jody Gladding. Los Angeles: Getty Publications, 2020.
 Mary Ann Caws: Dora Maar With And Without Picasso: A Biography, Thames & Hudson
 Mary Ann Caws, Les vies de Dora Maar : Bataille, Picasso et les surréalistes, Paris, Thames & Hudson, 2000, 224 p.
 Georgiana Colvile, Scandaleusement d'elles : trente-quatre femmes surréalistes, Paris, J.-M. Place, 1999, p. 179 à 185
 James Lord, Picasso and Dora : a personal memoir, 1993
 Judi Freeman: Picasso and the weeping women : the years of Marie-Thérèse Walter & Dora Maar
 Anne Baldassari: Picasso : love and war, 1935–1945
 Zoé Valdés : The weeping woman : a novel, 2013
 Alicia Dujovne Ortiz: Dora Maar prisonnière du regard, Le Livre de Poche, 2005.  
 Olivia Lahs-Gonzales: Defining eye : women photographers of the 20th century : selections from the Helen Kornblum collection

Content in this edit is translated from the existing French Wikipedia article at :fr:Dora Maar; see its history for attribution.

1907 births
1997 deaths
20th-century French painters
20th-century French women artists
French women painters
French women photographers
École des Beaux-Arts alumni
Académie Julian alumni
French artists' models
French surrealist artists
Muses
Analysands of Jacques Lacan
French people of Croatian descent
French expatriates in Croatia
French expatriates in Austria
French Roman Catholics
Artists from Paris
Women surrealist artists
20th-century women photographers
Pablo Picasso